My Little Old Boy (a.k.a. Mom's Diary: My Ugly Duckling) is a South Korean television entertainment program, distributed and syndicated by SBS every Sunday at 21:05 (KST).

, 324 episodes of My Little Old Boy have been aired.

Series overview

Episodes (2016)

Episodes (2017)

Episodes (2018)

Episodes (2019)

Episodes (2020)

Episodes (2021)

Episodes (2022)

Episodes (2023)

Notes

References

Lists of variety television series episodes
Lists of South Korean television series episodes